This is a list of priors of Worcester, until the Benedictine Order's dissolution in 1540.

References

Sources
Primary sources
 
Secondary sources
 
 

 
Worcester Cathedral
Christianity in Worcester, England
Anglican Diocese of Worcester
Worcestershire-related lists
Monasteries in Worcestershire